Oltion Luli (18 August 1969) born in Shkodër he is a former Albanian athlete, who competed at the 2000 Summer Olympic Games in the Men's 100m he finished 8th in his heat and failed to advance.

He was the Prefect of Shkodra region in 2005.
He is member of Shkodra Municipality Council.

References

 

Living people
1969 births
Sportspeople from Shkodër
Albanian male sprinters
Olympic athletes of Albania
Athletes (track and field) at the 2000 Summer Olympics